Stephen John Roberts (born 6 December 1958) is an Anglican priest. From 2015 to 2020 he was Deputy Diocesan Secretary in the Diocese of Southwark.  He was the Archdeacon of Wandsworth from 2005 to 2015. He was made an Honorary Canon of Southwark in September 2015.

Roberts was educated at Newcastle-under-Lyme High School and King's College London. Following training at Westcott House, Cambridge, he served as a curate at St Mary's  Riverhead with St John's Dunton Green and then at St Martin-in-the-Fields. After this he was vicar of St George's Camberwell followed by 11 years as warden of the Trinity College Centre in Peckham. From 2000 to 2005 he was Canon Treasurer of Southwark Cathedral and Senior Director of Ordinands for the Diocese of Southwark.

It was announced on 21 April 2015 that Roberts was to resign his archdeaconry, effective 1 September, in order to become deputy diocesan secretary. He retired in 2020.

References

1958 births
People educated at Newcastle-under-Lyme School
Alumni of King's College London
Alumni of Westcott House, Cambridge
Archdeacons of Wandsworth
Living people